The 1989–90 UAB Blazers men's basketball team represented the University of Alabama at Birmingham as a member of the Sun Belt Conference during the 1989–90 NCAA Division I men's basketball season. This was head coach Gene Bartow's 12th season at UAB, and the Blazers played their home games at UAB Arena. They finished the season 22–9, 12–2 in Sun Belt play and lost in the semifinals of the Sun Belt tournament. They received an at-large bid to the NCAA tournament as No. 10 seed in the East region. The Blazers fell in the opening round to UCLA, 68–56.

Roster

Schedule and results

|-
!colspan=9 style=| Regular season

|-
!colspan=9 style=| Sun Belt tournament

|-
!colspan=9 style=| NCAA tournament

References

UAB Blazers men's basketball seasons
UAB
UAB